Old Truronians is the name used to refer to people educated at Truro School, a mixed private boarding school located in the city of Truro, Cornwall, and its preparatory school, Truro Prep (formerly called Treliske School). The "Truro Wesleyan Middle Class College" (also referred to as Truro College) was founded by Wesleyan Methodists in 1880. The school moved to its current location, on top of Trennick Hill, in 1882. The name was changed to Truro School in 1931, when it was considered that it was "pretentious...to claim the style of 'College' if its pupils are for the most part below the age of 18". Girls were admitted into the sixth form in 1976, and the school became fully co-educational in 1990. In 2005, a history of the school entitled High on the Hill was produced by Joanna Wood to commemorate its 125th anniversary.

The name "Old Truronians" also refers to those educated at the historic Truro Cathedral School, founded in the 16th century and closed in 1982.

Notable former pupils

Academics
John Curtice, psephologist and Professor of Politics at the University of Strathclyde.

Armed forces
Peter King, WWII Commando and Military Cross recipient.

Arts and Media

Ros Atkins, BBC journalist and main presenter of Outside Source on BBC World News channel and the BBC World Service
James Hawes, British television director
John Rhys-Davies (1953–1963), actor whose films include The Lord of the Rings and Raiders of the Lost Ark
Robert Shaw (1939–1945), actor and novelist whose films include From Russia with Love, The Sting and Jaws
Nigel Terry (1956–1963), Shakespearean actor whose films include Excalibur, The Lion in Winter and Troy
Lawrence Ng, Hong Kong actor

Business and Industry
Geoffrey Healey, car designer
Paul Myners CBE (1956–66), businessman and Life Peer (Also listed under Politics)
Patrick Vallance, clinical pharmacologist and the Chief Scientific Adviser to the UK government (2018-)

Music

Derek Holman (1942–48), conductor, organist and composer
Benjamin Luxon (1948–1955), opera singer
Tom Middleton (1982–89), recording artist, music producer, remixer and DJ
Alan Opie (1956–1963), opera singer
Roger Taylor (1960–1968), drummer and vocalist for art rock group Queen
Luke Vibert (1984–1989), musician and recording artist within the electronica genre

Politics, Law and Religion
George Eustice (1982–87), Conservative MP (Camborne and Redruth, 2010–)
Julia Goldsworthy (1990–97), Liberal Democrat MP (Falmouth and Camborne, 2005–2010)
Joseph Hunkin (1896–1903); Bishop of Truro
Ray Jones QHC (born 1934), Anglican priest and Royal Navy chaplain
Sir Archibald Pellow Marshall (1911–17), High Court Judge (presided over the trial of Stephen Ward in 1963)
David Menhennet CB (1928-2016), 10th Librarian of the House of Commons Library
Paul Myners CBE (1956–66), businessman and Life Peer (Also listed under Business)
Lucy Nethsingha, Leader of Cambridgeshire County Council (2021-), MEP for the East of England (2019-2020).
David Penhaligon (1953–1961), Liberal MP (Truro and St Austell, 1974–1986)
Mark Prisk (1973–1980), Conservative MP (Hertford and Stortford, 2001–2019)
Matthew Taylor (Treliske School 1971–72), Liberal Democrat MP (Truro and St Austell, 1987–2010)
Nigel Haywood (1966–1973) (Governor of the Falkland Islands since 2010)

Sport
Michael Adams (1983–1990), Chess Grandmaster
Sir Ben Ainslie (1985–1993), Olympic sailor and four times gold medallist
Fran Brown, paraclimber and paratriathlete
Norman Croucher (1952–53), double amputee mountain climber
Laura Harper (1995–2000), England international cricketer
Finn Hawkins, British windsurfer
John Kendall-Carpenter, England international rugby union captain
Michael Munday (1995–2002), cricketer for Somerset CCC
Charlie Shreck (1991–1996), cricketer for Nottinghamshire CCC
Talan Skeels-Piggins (1982–1989), Paralympic alpine skier (Vancouver 2010)
Rob Thirlby (1989–1992), England international rugby sevens player

Notes

References

External links
Truro School website
TruroPrep website
Former Pupils' Association

 
Lists of people by English school affiliation
Cornwall-related biographical lists